The modern history of Yemen began with the withdrawal of the Ottoman Empire. In 1839 the British set up a protective area around the southern port of Aden and in 1918 the northern Kingdom of Yemen gained independence from the Ottoman Empire. North Yemen became a republic in 1962, but it was not until 1967 that the British Empire withdrew from what became South Yemen. In 1970, the southern government adopted a communist governmental system. The two countries were formally united as the Republic of Yemen on May 22, 1990.

North Yemen

Mutawakkilite Kingdom of Yemen

Ottoman suzerainty was re-established in northern Yemen in the late 19th century but its control was largely confined to cities, and the Zaidi imam's rule over Upper Yemen was formally recognized. Turkish forces withdrew in 1918, and Imam Yahya Muhammad strengthened his control over northern Yemen creating the Mutawakkilite Kingdom of Yemen. Yemen became a member of the Arab League in 1945 and the United Nations in 1947.

Imam Yahya died during an unsuccessful coup attempt in 1948, and was succeeded by his son Ahmad. Ahmad bin Yahya's reign was marked by growing repression, renewed friction with the United Kingdom over the British presence in the south, and growing pressures to support the Arab nationalist objectives of Egyptian President Gamal Abdul Nasser. He died in September 1962.

Yemen Arab Republic

Shortly after assuming power in 1962, Ahmad's son, the Crown Prince Muhammad al-Badr was deposed by revolutionary forces, who took control of Sana'a and created the Yemen Arab Republic (YAR). Egypt assisted the YAR with troops and supplies to combat forces loyal to the Kingdom. Saudi Arabia and Jordan supported Badr's royalist forces to oppose the newly formed republic starting the North Yemen Civil War. Conflict continued periodically until 1967 when Egyptian troops were withdrawn. By 1968, following a final royalist siege of Sana'a, most of the opposing leaders reached a reconciliation and Saudi Arabia recognized the Republic in 1970.

South Yemen

British domain, Colony of Aden and Aden protectorate
British interests in the area which would later become South Yemen, began to grow when in 1839, British East India Company forces captured the port of Aden, to provide a coaling station for ships en route to India. The colony, known as the Aden Settlement, gained much political and strategic importance after the opening of the Suez Canal in 1869.

Aden was ruled as part of British India until 1937, when the city of Aden became the Colony of Aden, a crown colony in its own right. The Aden hinterland and Hadhramaut to the east formed the remainder of what would become South Yemen and was not administered directly by Aden but were tied to Britain by treaties of protection. Starting in the latter decades of the 19th century and continuing into the 20th century, Britain signed agreements with local rulers of traditional polities that, together, became known as the Aden Protectorate. The area was divided into numerous sultanates, emirates, and sheikhdoms, and was divided for administrative purposes into the East Aden Protectorate and the West Aden Protectorate. The eastern protectorate consisted of the three Hadhramaut states (Qu'aiti State of Shihr and Mukalla, Kathiri State of Seiyun, Mahra Sultanate of Qishn and Socotra) with the remaining states comprising the west. Economic development was largely centred in Aden, and while the city flourished partly due to the discovery of crude oil on the Arabian Peninsula in the 1930s, the states of the Aden Protectorate stagnated.

Encouraged by the rhetoric of President Nasser of Egypt against British colonial rule in the Middle East, pressure for the British to leave grew. Following Nasser's creation of the United Arab Republic, attempts to incorporate Yemen in turn threatened Aden and the Protectorate. To counter this, the British attempted to unite the various states under its protection and, on 11 February 1959, six of the West Aden Protectorate states formed the Federation of Arab Emirates of the South to which nine other states were subsequently added. During the 1960s, the British sought to incorporate all of the Aden Protectorate territories into the Federation. On 18 January 1963, the Colony of Aden was incorporated against the wishes of much of the city's populace as the State of Aden and the Federation was renamed the Federation of South Arabia. Several more states subsequently joined the Federation and the remaining states that declined to join, mainly in Hadhramaut, formed the Protectorate of South Arabia.

In 1963, fighting between Egyptian forces and British-led Saudi-financed guerrillas in the Yemen Arab Republic spread to South Arabia with the formation of the National Liberation Front (NLF), who hoped to force the British out of South Arabia.  Hostilities started with a grenade attack by the NLF against the British High Commissioner on 10 December 1963, killing one person and injuring fifty, and a state of emergency was declared, becoming known as the Aden Emergency.

In 1964, the new British government under Harold Wilson announced their intention to hand over power to the Federation of South Arabia in 1968, but that the British military would remain. There were around 280 guerrilla attacks in 1964, and over 500 in 1965. In 1966, the British Government announced that all British forces would be withdrawn at independence. In response, the security situation deteriorated with the creation of the socialist Front for the Liberation of Occupied South Yemen (FLOSY) which started to attack the NLF in a bid for power, as well as attacking the British.

In January 1967, there were mass riots by NLF and FLOSY supporters in the old Arab quarter of Aden town, which continued until mid February, despite the intervention of British troops. During the period there were many attacks on the troops, and an Aden Airways Douglas DC-3 plane was destroyed in the air with no survivors. At the same time, the members of FLOSY and the NLF were also killing each other in large numbers.

The temporary closure of the Suez Canal in 1967 effectively negated the last reason that British had kept hold of the colonies in Yemen, and, in the face of uncontrollable violence, they began to withdraw.

On 20 June 1967, there was a mutiny in the Federation of South Arabia Army, which also spread to the police. Order was restored by the British, mainly due to the efforts of the 1st Battalion Argyll and Sutherland Highlanders, under the command of Lt-Col. Colin Mitchell.

People's Republic of South Yemen (1967–1990)
The British finally pulled out on 30 November 1967, leaving Aden under NLF control. The Royal Marines, who had been the first British troops to occupy Aden in 1839, were the last to leave. The Federation of South Arabia collapsed, and Southern Yemen became independent as the People's Republic of South Yemen. The NLF, with the support of the army, attained total control of the new state after defeating the FLOSY and the states of the former Federation in a drawn out campaign of terror.

In June 1969, a Marxist wing of the NLF gained power and changed the country's name to the People's Democratic Republic of Yemen (PDRY) on 1 December 1970. In the PDRY, all political parties were amalgamated into the Yemeni Socialist Party (YSP), which became the only legal party. The PDRY established close ties with the Soviet Union, the People's Republic of China, Cuba, and Palestine.

These major communist powers assisted in the building of the PDRY's armed forces. Strong support from Moscow resulted in the Soviet Navy gaining access to naval facilities in South Yemen.

Relations between North Yemen and South Yemen

1972 conflict

Although the governments of the PDRY and the YAR declared that they approved a future union in 1972, little progress was made toward unification, and relations were often strained. A declaration was made in 1972 that unification would eventually occur. However, fighting erupted between North Yemen and South Yemen in October of that year; North Yemen was supplied by Saudi Arabia and South Yemen by the USSR. The fighting was short-lived, and led to the Cairo Agreement of October 28, 1972, which put forward a plan to unify the two countries.

1979 conflict

Fighting broke out again in February and March 1979, with South Yemen allegedly supplying aid to rebels in the north through the National Democratic Front and crossing the border. Southern forces made it as far as the city of Taizz before withdrawing.<ref>Hoagland, Edward, Balancing Acts',Globe Pequot, 1999, page 218</ref> This conflict was also short-lived. The war was only stopped by an Arab League intervention. The goal of unity was reaffirmed by the northern and southern heads of state during a summit meeting in Kuwait in March 1979.

What the PDRY government failed to tell the YAR government was that it wished to be the dominant power in any unification, and left wing rebels in North Yemen began to receive extensive funding and arms from South Yemen.

1980s
In 1980, PDRY president Abdul Fattah Ismail resigned and went into exile. His successor, Ali Nasir Muhammad, took a less interventionist stance toward both North Yemen and neighbouring Oman.

South Yemen Civil War

On January 13, 1986, a civil war broke out in Aden between Ali Nasir's supporters and supporters of the returned Ismail, who wanted power back. Fighting lasted for more than a month and resulted in thousands of casualties, Ali Nasir's ouster, and Ismail's death. Some 60,000 people, including the deposed Ali Nasir, fled to the YAR.

Unification talks (1988-1990)
In May 1988, the YAR and PDRY governments came to an understanding that considerably reduced tensions including agreement to renew discussions concerning unification, to establish a joint oil exploration area along their undefined border, to demilitarize the border, and to allow Yemenis unrestricted border passage on the basis of only a national identification card.

In November 1989, the leaders of the YAR (Ali Abdullah Saleh) and the PDRY (Ali Salim al-Baidh) agreed on a draft unity constitution originally drawn up in 1981. 

Efforts toward unification proceeded from 1988 and, on May 22, 1990, the Republic of Yemen's independence was declared.

Republic of Yemen
Unification and transitional period
The Republic of Yemen (ROY) was declared on 22 May 1990 with Saleh becoming President and al-Baidh Vice President. For the first time in centuries, much of geographical Greater Yemen was politically united.

A 30-month transitional period for completing the unification of the two political and economic systems was set. A presidential council was jointly elected by the 26-member YAR advisory council and the 17-member PDRY presidium. The presidential council appointed a Prime Minister, who formed a Cabinet. There was also a 301-seat provisional unified parliament, consisting of 159 members from the north, 111 members from the south, and 31 independent members appointed by the chairman of the council.

A unity constitution was agreed upon in May 1990 and ratified by the populace in May 1991. It affirmed Yemen's commitment to free elections, a multiparty political system, the right to own private property, equality under the law, and respect of basic human rights. Parliamentary elections were held on 27 April 1993. International groups assisted in the organization of the elections and observed actual balloting. The resulting Parliament included 143 GPC, 69 YSP, 63 Islaah (Yemeni grouping for reform, a party composed of various tribal and religious groups), 6 Baathis, 3 Nasserists, 2 Al Haq, and 15 independents. The head of Islaah, Paramount Hashid Sheik Abdallah Bin Husayn Al-Ahmar, is the speaker of Parliament.

Islaah was invited into the ruling coalition, and the presidential council was altered to include one Islaah member. Conflicts within the coalition resulted in the self-imposed exile of Vice President Ali Salim Al-Bidh to Aden beginning in August 1993 and a deterioration in the general security situation as political rivals settled scores and tribal elements took advantage of the unsettled situation.

1994 civil war
Haydar Abu Bakr Al-Attas, the former PDRY Prime Minister continued to serve as the ROY Prime Minister, but his government was ineffective due to political infighting. Continuous negotiations between northern and southern leaders resulted in the signing of the document of pledge and accord in Amman, Jordan on 20 February 1994. Despite this, clashes intensified until civil war broke out in early May 1994.

Almost all of the actual fighting in the 1994 civil war occurred in the southern part of the country despite air and missile attacks against cities and major installations in the north.  The United States strongly supported stopping the war and called for a cease-fire and a return to the negotiating table. Various attempts, including by a UN special envoy, were unsuccessful to effect a cease-fire.

Southern leaders declared secession and the establishment of the Democratic Republic of Yemen (DRY) on 21 May 1994, but the DRY was not recognized by the international community. Ali Nasir Muhammad supporters greatly assisted military operations against the secessionists and Aden was occupied on 7 July 1994. Other resistance quickly collapsed and thousands of southern leaders and military went into exile.

Early during the fighting, President Ali Abdallah Salih announced a general amnesty which applied to everyone except a list of 16 persons. Most southerners returned to Yemen after a short exile.

An armed opposition was announced from Saudi Arabia, but no significant incidents within Yemen materialized. The government prepared legal cases against four southern leaders--Ali Salim al-Baidh, Haydar Abu Bakr Al-Attas, Abd Al-Rahman Ali Al-Jifri, and Salih Munassar Al-Siyali—for misappropriation of official funds. Others on the list of 16 were told informally they could return to take advantage of the amnesty, but most remained outside Yemen. Although many of Ali Nasir Muhammad's followers were appointed to senior governmental positions (including Vice President, Chief of Staff, and Governor of Aden), Ali Nasir Muhammad himself remained abroad in Syria.

In the aftermath of the civil war, YSP leaders within Yemen reorganized the party and elected a new politburo in July 1994. However, the party remained disheartened and without its former influence. Islaah held a party convention in September 1994. The GPC did the same in June 1995.

Mid 1990s
In 1994, amendments to the unity constitution eliminated the presidential council. President Ali Abdallah Salih was elected by Parliament on 1 October 1994 to a 5-year term. The constitution provides that henceforth the President will be elected by popular vote from at least two candidates selected by the legislature. Yemen held its first direct presidential elections in September 1999, electing President Ali Abdallah Salih to a 5-year term in what were generally considered free and fair elections. Yemen held its second multiparty parliamentary elections in April 1997.

2000s
On October 12, 2000, the USS Cole - an American guided missile destroyer - was attacked by waterborne terrorists as the American ship was refueling in the port of Aden. Two suicide bombers approached the Cole in a small boat loaded with explosives. Once alongside the ship, the men detonated the explosives, killing themselves and 17 American sailors.  It was later determined the bombers were part of Osama bin Laden's Al-Qaida terrorist network.

Constitutional amendments adopted in the summer of 2000 extended the presidential term by 2 years, thus moving the next presidential elections to 2006. The amendments also extended the parliamentary term of office to a 6-year term, thus moving elections for these seats to 2003. On 20 February 2001, a new constitutional amendment created a bicameral legislature, the Assembly of Representatives of Yemen, consisting of a Shura Council (111 seats; members appointed by the president) and a House of Representatives (301 seats; members elected by popular vote).

In the 2000s the government has been fighting rebel groups such as the one led by Hussein al-Houthi's Zaydi movement Shabab al-Mu'mineen, "The Young Believers". (See Shia insurgency in Yemen.)

2011 Yemeni Revolution and subsequent crisis

The 2011 Yemeni protests followed the initial stages of the Tunisian revolution and occurred simultaneously with the Egyptian Revolution and other mass protests in the Arab world in early 2011. The protests were initially against unemployment, economic conditions and corruption, as well as against the government's proposals to modify the constitution of Yemen. The protestors' demands then escalated to calls for President Ali Abdullah Saleh to resign.

A major demonstration of over 16,000 protestors took place in Sana'a on 27 January. On 2 February, President Saleh announced he would not run for reelection in 2013 and that he would not pass power to his son. On 3 February, 20,000 people protested against the government in Sana'a, others protested in Aden, in a "Day of Rage" called for by Tawakel Karman, while soldiers, armed members of the General People's Congress and many protestors held a pro-government rally in Sana'a. In a "Friday of Anger" on 18 February, tens of thousands of Yemenis took part in anti-government demonstrations in Taiz, Sana'a and Aden. On a "Friday of No Return" on 11 March, protestors called for the ousting of Saleh in Sana'a where three people were killed. More protests were held in other cities, including Mukalla, where one person was killed. On 18 March, protesters in Sana'a were fired upon resulting in over 40 deaths and ultimately culminating in mass defections and resignations.

On 23 April Saleh accepted a proposal to step down and shift control to his deputy after thirty days.  The agreement included immunity for him and his family and further required the opposition to stop public protests and join a coalition with Saleh's ruling party. Reactions to Saleh's acceptance have been reserved, without the agreement formalized or accepted by both sides and with the possibility of the stand-off continuing.

On 22 May Saleh had agreed to the deal only to back away hours before the scheduled signing for the third time. On 23 May Sheikh Sadiq al-Ahmar, the head of the Hashid tribal federation, one of the most powerful tribes in the country, declared support for the opposition and his armed supporters came into conflict with loyalist security forces in the capital Sana'a. Heavy street fighting ensued, which included artillery and mortar shelling (see Battle of Sana'a).

Saleh and several others were injured and at least five people were killed by a 3 June rocket attack on the presidential compound when ordnance struck a mosque used by high-level government officials for prayer services. The next day, Vice President Abd al-Rab Mansur al-Hadi took over as acting president while Saleh flew to Saudi Arabia to be treated. As Saleh flew to the Saudi capital of Riyadh for surgery on 4 June, a cease-fire was brokered by Saudi Arabia's King Abdullah.

In early July the government has repeatedly rejected the opposition's demands, including the formation of a transitional council with the goal of formally transferring power from the current administration to a caretaker government intended to oversee Yemen's first-ever democratic elections. In response, factions of the opposition announced the formation of their own 17-member transitional council on 16 July, though the Joint Meeting Parties that have functioned as an umbrella for many of the Yemeni opposition groups during the uprising said the council did not represent them and did not match their "plan" for the country.

References
Original text from U.S. State Dept. Country Study
(1): DAUM, W. (ed.): Yemen. 3000 years of art and civilisation in Arabia Felix''., Innsbruck / Frankfurt am Main / Amsterdam [1988]. pp. 53–4.
History of Yemen
A Dam at Marib
Das Fenster zum Jemen (German)
Geschichte des Jemen (German)

Citations

External links
The Birth of Modern Yemen, Brian Whitaker, 2009, "An e-book by Brian Whitaker exploring Yemen's political development since unification of north and south in 1990"

 
Yemen